The Bezirksliga Mittelfranken 1, formerly the Bezirksliga Mittelfranken Nord, is currently the seventh tier of the German football league system in the northern part of the Bavarian Regierungsbezirk of Middle Franconia. Until the disbanding of the Bezirksoberliga Mittelfranken in 2012 it was the eighth tier. From 2008, when the 3. Liga was introduced, it was the seventh tier of the league system, until the introduction of the Regionalligas in 1994 the sixth tier. From the league's inception in 1963 to the introduction of the Bezirksoberliga in 1988 it was the fifth tier.

Overview

History
Before the Bezirksoberligas in Bavaria were introduced in 1988 the Bezirksligas were the leagues set right below the Landesligas Bayern in the football pyramid from 1963 onwards, when the Landesligas and Bezirksligas were established. Until the establishment of the Bezirksoberliga, the league champions were not automatically promoted but instead had to play-off for promotion as there was six Bezirksligas feeding the Landesliga Mitte, two each in Middle Franconia, Upper Palatinate and Lower Bavaria.

In 1988, when the Bezirksoberligas were introduced, the league lost some of its status as it was relegated one tier. On a positive note, the league champions were now always promoted and the league runners-up had the opportunity to play-off for promotion as well. After the 2010–11 season the league's name was changed from the geographical distinction Nord to a number, becoming the Bezirksliga Mittelfranken 1.

With the league reform at the end of the 2011–12 season, which included an expansion of the number of Landesligas from three to five, the Bezirksoberligas were disbanded. Instead, the Bezirksligas took the place of the Bezirksoberligas once more below the Landesligas.

Format
The winner of the Bezirksliga Mittelfranken-Nord, like the winner of the Bezirksliga Mittelfranken-Süd was, until 2011, directly promoted to the Bezirksoberliga Mittelfranken. The runners-up of the Bezirksligas in Middle Franconia would take part in a promotion round with the best-placed Bezirksoberliga team which did finish on a relegation rank to determine one or more additional promotion spots, depending on availability. From the 2012–13 season onwards, the league champion will be promoted to one of the Landesligas, depending on geographic location.

The bottom three teams of each group are relegated to one of the Kreisligas.
At the same time the Kreisliga champions were promoted to the Bezirksliga. The runners-up of the Kreisligas faced a play-off with each other and the 13th placed teams in the Bezirksliga.

The Bezirksliga Mittelfranken 1 is fed by the following Kreisligas:
 Kreisliga Erlangen/Pegnitzgrund 1
 Kreisliga Erlangen/Pegnitzgrund 2
 Kreisliga Nürnberg/Frankenhöhe 2

From 1995, the league was generally operated with a strength of 16 clubs and rarely deviated from this until 2012, when the number was increased to 18. In 2019, it was decreased back to 16.

League timeline
The league went through the following timeline of positions in the league system:

League champions
The winners and runners–up of the league:

1963–88
The league champions and runners–up while being a feeder league to the Landesliga:

1988–2012
The league champions and runners–up while being a feeder league to the Bezirksoberliga:

2012–present
The league champions and runners–up while being a feeder league to the Landesliga once more:

 Promoted teams in bold.
 + Teams finished on equal points, decider needed to determine final position.
 In 2008 third placed FSV Stadeln was also promoted.
 In 2020 the season was suspended and later extended to 2021, when the champion and the runner-up were ranked on a points per game basis.

Current clubs
The clubs in the league in the 2021–22 season and their 2019–21 final positions:

References

Sources
 50 Jahre Bayerischer Fußball-Verband  50-year-anniversary book of the Bavarian FA. Vindelica Verlag. 1996

External links 
 Bayerischer-Fußball Verband (Bavarian FA)  
 Bavarian League tables and results  
 Website with tables and results from the Bavarian Oberliga to Bezirksliga  

4
Football in Middle Franconia
1963 establishments in West Germany
Bezirksliga
Sports leagues established in 1963